Robert Frank Knoop (born October 18, 1938) is an American former Major League Baseball second baseman and coach. In his nine-year MLB career, he appeared in 1,153 games as a member of the Los Angeles / California Angels (1964–69), Chicago White Sox (1969–70) and Kansas City Royals (1971–72).

Biography
Nicknamed "Nureyev" by sportswriters for his exciting and acrobatic fielding plays, Knoop played a deep second base, with exceptional range and a strong arm. He turned the double play well along with shortstop Jim Fregosi, to give the Angels outstanding keystone defense. In , the pair both won the Gold Glove award at their respective positions—the second of three Gold Gloves Knoop would capture from 1966–68; he was the American League's starting second baseman in the 1966 Major League Baseball All-Star Game, and went hitless in two at bats. As a hitter, he had his best season during , with career-highs of 17 home runs, 72 RBI, 54 runs and 11 triples.

Knoop was born in Sioux City, Iowa to parents Frank and Mabel Knoop. His father was a German immigrant while his mother was a descendant of Swiss and Norwegian immigrants. After attending Montebello High School in Montebello, California, he was signed by the Milwaukee Braves in 1956.  The Angels obtained him via the Rule 5 draft, by the rules of which he was required to remain on the 1964 major-league roster.  He in fact played in every game that season and remained the Angels' regular second baseman for the next five and a half years, winning the club's MVP award four times in the span, a mark tied by Garret Anderson and Mike Trout.  Knoop was sent to the White Sox in mid-1969 and then was traded to the Royals in 1971.  With Kansas City, he played mostly as a backup for Cookie Rojas.

In his career Knoop batted .236, with 56 home runs, 331 RBIs, 337 runs, 856 hits, 129 doubles, 29 triples, and 16 stolen bases in 1153 games.

After retiring, Knoop worked for over 40 years as a minor league and major league coach, scout and adviser, including stints with the Chicago White Sox (1977–78), Angels (1979–96 and 2013–18), Toronto Blue Jays (2000) and Colorado Rockies (2008–12). In 1994 Knoop served as manager of the Angels for two games, posting a 1–1 record. In February 2019, Knoop retired from Major League Baseball, after a career that lasted 53 years.

See also
 List of Major League Baseball annual triples leaders
 List of Gold Glove middle infield duos

References

External links

 Page at AngelFire

1938 births
Living people
American League All-Stars
American people of German descent
American people of Norwegian descent
American people of Swiss descent
Austin Senators players
Baseball coaches from Iowa
Baseball players from Iowa
California Angels players
California Angels coaches
Cedar Rapids Braves players
Chicago White Sox coaches
Chicago White Sox players
Colorado Rockies scouts
Gold Glove Award winners
Hawaii Islanders players
Kansas City Royals players
Los Angeles Angels players
Los Angeles Angels coaches
Louisville Colonels (minor league) players
Major League Baseball first base coaches
Major League Baseball second basemen
Toronto Blue Jays coaches
San Diego Padres (minor league) players
Sportspeople from Montebello, California
Sportspeople from Sioux City, Iowa
Toronto Maple Leafs (International League) players
Vancouver Mounties players